The Cebu Dolphins are a baseball team in the Baseball Philippines formed in 2007 as one of its charter members. Owned by Industrial Enterprises and assigned in the league's South Division, the Dolphins won their first championship during the league's Series 2.

Along with four national team members, the team is composed mostly of past and present players from the De La Salle Green Archers in the UAAP and a few coming from the Cebu province. The team is coached by DLSU and national softball team coach Isaac Bacarisas.

Cebu was among the top teams in Series 1 by posting a clean 4-0 elimination round slate only to lose to eventual champion Makati Mariners in the semis and then to the Manila Sharks for third place. The Dolphins, however, recovered in Series 2 by posting a seven-win, three-loss card after the elimination before ousting Dumaguete for the division title. They then went on to defeat the Sharks in a grueling three-game matchup which saw an impressive pitching effort by Joseph Orillana.

Roster
 Angeles, Ruben, Infielder, RP Team
 Angeles, Kristoper, Infielder, DLSU
 Alquiros, Marco, Infielder, DLSU
 Ardio, Jeffrey, Pitcher/Utility, DLSU
 Atilano, Emerson, Infielder
 Bacarisas, Jerome, Infielder/Pitcher, RTU
 Baroque, Gabby, First Baseman/Outfielder, DLSU
 Baroque, Miguel, Catcher, DLSU
 Binarao, Joel, Infielder
 Corcuera, Miggy, First Baseman, DLSU
 Dela Cerna, JR, Utility
 De Juras, Sofronio
 De Ubago, Jon, Outfielder
 Gomez, Richard, Outfielder
 Olaybar, Anthony, Infielder
 Omandac, Saxon, Infielder/Pitcher
 Orillana, Joseph, Pitcher, Utility, RP Team
 Orobia, Jordan
 Palacol, Roswald
 Ponce, Jonash, Centerfielder, RP Team
 Rances, Fulgencio, Catcher, RP Team
 Seung Jun, Ha, Pitcher/Infielder, PCU
 Uichico, Nico, Utility, DLSU
Vijandre, Eric, Utility, DLSU

Tournament results

External links
 Baseball Philippines Official Site: Cebu Dolphins

Baseball teams established in 2007
Baseball Philippines
Baseball teams in the Philippines
Sports in Cebu
2007 establishments in the Philippines